Shay Stephenson (born September 13, 1983) is a Canadian former professional hockey player. He played in 2 games in the  National Hockey League with the Los Angeles Kings during the 2006–07 season. The rest of his career, which lasted from 2004 to 2022, was spent in European leagues and then in senior leagues in Canada. He is the son of Bob Stephenson and the older brother of Logan Stephenson. He is also second  cousin to Chandler Stephenson as Shay's father and Chandler's father are first cousins.

Career statistics

Regular season and playoffs

Transactions
 June 21, 2001 - Drafted by the Edmonton Oilers in the 9th round, 278th overall.
 June 22, 2003 - Re-entered the NHL draft, drafted by the Carolina Hurricanes in the 7th round, 198th overall.
 August 17, 2005 - Signed by the Los Angeles Kings as a free agent.
 January 25, 2010 - Moved to Norway to play for Vålerenga Ishockey.

References

External links
 

1983 births
Living people
Canadian ice hockey left wingers
Carolina Hurricanes draft picks
Edmonton Oilers draft picks
Ice hockey people from Saskatchewan
Karlskrona HK players
Krefeld Pinguine players
Las Vegas Wranglers players
Los Angeles Kings players
Manchester Monarchs (AHL) players
HC Milano players
People from Outlook, Saskatchewan
Reading Royals players
Red Deer Rebels players
Sparta Warriors players
IF Sundsvall Hockey players
Vålerenga Ishockey players
Canadian expatriate ice hockey players in the United States
Canadian expatriate ice hockey players in Sweden
Canadian expatriate ice hockey players in Germany
Canadian expatriate ice hockey players in Italy
Canadian expatriate ice hockey players in Norway